Laughing Villa is an Indian Malayalam celebrity comedy chat show which premiered on Surya TV from 30 July 2016 to 17 November 2019.

The first season of the show was hosted by south-Indian film actors Navya Nair and Maniyanpilla Raju. The show also cast Surabhi Lakshmi, Manju Pillai, Naseer Sankranthi and Noby Marcose as  character artists.

Surya TV has launched the second season of show from 2 April 2017 in a new format as a kids reality show. Jyothi Krishna hosts the show.

Surya TV has launched the third season of show from 18 May 2018 as movie promotion - talk show. Gayathri Arun hosts the show

Concept 
Season 1
The show consists of different segments where the celebrities plays the quiz games by Mr.X which is starred by the popular comedian-turned-actor Noby Marcose. The show started to telecast since 30 July 2016 .
Season 2
The Kids team of Laughing Villa Season 2 will be supported by State Award winner Surabhi Lakshmi and Kishor with their special skit. Laughing Villa Season 2 is opened by Suraj Venjaramoodu.  The kids' team performances including skits, film scoops and special performances will be judged by celebs who will be guests of the respective episodes. The show was launched on 2 April 2017 and is hosted by Jyothi Krishna and from January 2018 show is hosted by television actress Gayathri Arun for a short span. It has a format similar to Junior Super Star.

Season 3

On 18 May 2018 the show was launched in a different manner as a movie promotion show along with skits by kids from television and film industries. The show is hosted by television actress Gayathri Arun.

Cast

Cast season 1 
Main cast
 Maniyanpilla Raju as Owner of Laughing Villa/Rajuettan
 Navya Nair as Sister of Rajuettan
 Manju Pillai as Wife of Rajuettan
 Surabhi Lakshmi as PA of Navya Nair/Suru
 Naseer Sankranthi as Various roles/sankranthiri
Supporting cast
 Noby Marcose as Mr.X
 Devi Chandana
 Kochu Preman
Subbalakshmi as Muttashi
 Lakshmi Priya
Sethulakshmi amma
 Abu Salim
 Vinod Kovoor

Cast season 2
Host
2017 -  Jyothi  Krishna2018 -  Gayathri Arun (few episodes)2018 -  Jyothi Krishna
Mentors
  Surabhi Lakshmi
 Kishore

Cast season 3
Host
Gayatri Arun
Other cast
Sneha Sreekumar as various roles

References 

Malayalam-language television shows
2016 Indian television series debuts
Surya TV original programming